Akola East Assembly constituency is one of the 288 constituencies of Maharashtra Vidhan Sabha and one of the five which are located in the Akola district.

It is a part of the Akola (Lok Sabha constituency) along with five other assembly constituencies, viz Akot, Balapur, Akola West, and Murtizapur (SC)  and Risod  from the Washim district.

As per orders of Delimitation of Parliamentary and Assembly constituencies Order, 2008, No. 31 Akola East Assembly constituency is composed of the following: 
Akola Tehsil (Part) - Akola (M.Corp.) (Part), Ward No 8 to 12, 31 to 37 and 54 to 55, 2. Akot Tehsil (Part), Revenue Circle-Kutasa, Chohatta, 3. Akola Tehsil (Part)-Ghusar, Palso BK., Borgaon Manju, Kapshi and Akola, Umari Pragane Balapur (CT) and Malkapur (CT). of the district.

Members of Legislative Assembly

Election results

2019

See also
Akola

Notes

Assembly constituencies of Maharashtra
Akola